Hrvoje is a Croatian male ethnic first name derived from "Hrvat" meaning "Croat". Notable people with the name include:

 Hrvoje Čale (born 1985), Croatian football back
 Hrvoje Horvat (born 1946), Croatian handball back
 Hrvoje Klasić (born 1972), Croatian historian
 Hrvoje Kovačević (born 1982), Croatian football midfielder
 Hrvoje Panžić (born 1978), Croatian judoka
 Hrvoje Perić (born 1985), Croatian basketball forward
 Hrvoje Petek (born 1958), Croatian American physicist
 Hrvoje Šarinić (1935–2017), Croatian politician who served as Prime Minister
 Hrvoje Slovenc, (born 1976) Croatian-American fine-art photographer
 Hrvoje Vejić (born 1977), Croatian footballer
 Hrvoje Vukčić Hrvatinić (c. 1350–1416), Bosnian nobleman, duke of medieval Bosnia

See also
 Slavic names

External links
http://www.behindthename.com/name/hrvoje

Croatian masculine given names
Slavic masculine given names